In their -year history, the Dallas Mavericks have selected the following players in the National Basketball Association draft.

Key

Draft selections

Notes

References

Dallas Mavericks Draft at Basketball-Reference.com

 
National Basketball Association draft
draft history